Mosese Taga (17 September 1964 – 2 February 2022) was a Fijian rugby union player.

Career
He debuted with the Flying Fijians during the 1987 Rugby World Cup, during the match against New Zealand at Christchurch, on 27 May 1987. He was also part of the 1991 Rugby World Cup roster, where he was the captain. His last international cap was during a match against Australia, at Sydney on 18 September 1998.

Personal life and death
Taga died on 2 February 2022, at the age of 57. He was the father of Laisa Taga, who plays for Fiji women's national rugby union team as flanker.

Notes

External links
 

1964 births
2022 deaths
Fiji international rugby union players
Fijian rugby union players
People from Yalalevu
Rugby union hookers
Rugby union props